DIS3-like exonuclease 1 (Dis3L1 or Dis3L) is an enzyme that in humans is encoded by the DIS3L gene. Its protein product is an RNase enzyme homologous to the yeast protein Rrp44, and can be part of the exosome complex in the cytoplasm of eukaryotic cells.

References

EC 3.1.13